Sporostigma is a genus of lichenized fungi in the order Arthoniales. Its familial placement is uncertain. This is a monotypic genus, containing the single species Sporostigma melaspora.

References

Arthoniomycetes
Lichen genera
Monotypic Ascomycota genera
Taxa described in 2001